Loznica is a village in the municipality of Bijelo Polje, Montenegro.

Demographics
According to the 2003 census, the village had a population of 279 people.

According to the 2011 census, its population was 1,296.

References

Populated places in Bijelo Polje Municipality